In Polish culture, the nostalgia for the Polish People's Republic is nostalgia for aspects of life in Polish People's Republic (PRL).

As with other manifestations of Communist nostalgia, for people who lived in the times of the PRL, the two major factors of PRL nostalgia are the dissatisfaction with the present and the memory of the happy and most recollected past.

Businesses were quick to respond to the phenomenon by renewing the manufacture of products from PRL times, such as warm ice cream, Polo-Cockta, Junak motorcycles, Ludwik laundry detergent. 

In Ridgewood, Queens, New York, in a Polish-American enclave, there is a Pewex pharmacy, health & beauty store, that pays homage to the original Pewex in the PRL.

See also
 PRL Museum, Kraków
 Communist nostalgia
 Nostalgia for the Soviet Union
 Ostalgie, in the former East Germany
 Yugo-nostalgia, in the former Socialist Federal Republic of Yugoslavia

References

External links
 Communism Museum, Warsaw

 
Polish People's Republic
Polish culture